Eva Nassif (in Arabic إيفا ناصيف) is a Canadian politician and a Certified Translator who served as the Member of Parliament for the riding of Vimy in the House of Commons of Canada from 2015 to 2019 as a member of the Liberal Party of Canada.

Background and education

Born in Ain el Dilb, South Lebanon, Lebanon, Nassif got her diploma in nursing in Lebanon and worked as a registered nurse for five years in the American University Hospital (AUH) in Beirut before arriving in Canada.

After immigrating to Canada in 1993, she obtained a Bachelor of Arts degree in translation and a Master of Arts in translation studies from Concordia University. The subject of her master's dissertation was "the terminology of proteomics". She became a certified translator and terminologist. She also worked as a teacher for the Laval School Board.

Nassif is an activist for women's rights and social and youth affairs and is actively involved in a number of organizations. From 2009 to 2015, she worked for an NGO specializing in educating Canadian youth and helping their integration into public life.

Federal politics

Nassif ran as the Liberal candidate for the riding of Laval in the 2011 federal election. She placed third.

In the 2015 federal election, she again ran as a Liberal candidate, this time for the riding of Vimy. She won the riding by a substantial margin.

In August 2019 the Liberal riding president for Vimy claimed that the Liberal Party prevented Nassif from earning the party's nomination for the 2019 federal election. Nassif claimed she was not nominated to run because she did not publicly support Trudeau as a feminist following the SNC-Lavalin affair.

Following the dispute the riding association refused to transfer campaign funds to the new candidate Annie Koutrakis.

Personal life

Nassif is married to a PhD engineer Georges Abi-Saad and is the mother of triplets Charbel, Maroun and Josée.

Electoral record

References

External links
 Profile at Liberal Party of Canada (copy archived March 2016)

Living people
Members of the House of Commons of Canada from Quebec
Liberal Party of Canada MPs
Women members of the House of Commons of Canada
Lebanese emigrants to Canada
Politicians from Laval, Quebec
Concordia University alumni
American University of Beirut alumni
Women in Quebec politics
21st-century Canadian politicians
21st-century Canadian women politicians
Year of birth missing (living people)
Canadian politicians of Lebanese descent
21st-century Canadian translators